Vincke or von Vincke is a surname. Notable people with the surname include:

 Georg von Vincke (1811–1875), Prussian politician, officer, landowner and aristocrat of the Vincke family
 Gerald Lee Vincke (1964), American prelate of the Roman Catholic Church
 Karl von Vincke (1800–1869), Prussian officer and politician
 Ludwig von Vincke (1774–1844), Prussian politician

See also
 Finke